The 1997 Internazionali Femminili di Palermo was a women's tennis tournament played on outdoor clay courts in Palermo, Italy that was part of the Tier IV category of the 1997 WTA Tour. It was the tenth edition of the tournament and was held from 14 July until 20 July 1997. Second-seeded Sandrine Testud won the singles title.

Finals

Singles

 Sandrine Testud defeated  Elena Makarova 7–5, 6–3
 It was Testud's only title of the year and the 1st of her career.

Doubles

 Silvia Farina /  Barbara Schett defeated  Florencia Labat /  Mercedes Paz 2–6, 6–1, 6–4
 It was Farina's only title of the year and the 2nd of her career. It was Schett's 1st title of the year and the 3rd of her career.

References

External links
 ITF tournament edition details
 Tournament draws

Internazionali Femminili di Palermo
Internazionali Femminili di Palermo
1997 in Italian women's sport
Torneo